This article lists the tallest buildings in the coastal city of Sunny Isles Beach, Florida, located in the northeast corner of Miami-Dade County. The ranking primarily relies on data from The Skyscraper Center, the public online database of skyscrapers by the Council on Tall Buildings and Urban Habitat. Supplementary data may be provided by Emporis, SkyscraperPage, or other third party news entities. Sunny Isles Beach had very few skyscrapers until the 2000s, when many were constructed on the east side of Collins Avenue, on the beach adjacent to the Atlantic Ocean. This strip historically consisted of a row of low rise hotels known as "Motel Row", mostly developed midcentury in the MiMo architectural style. Even among high-rises, the oldest such structures in the city only date to the 1960s. The wall of skyscrapers spans nearly the entire length of the city longitudinally, from the three Trump Towers located near the border of Haulover Park to the south to Regalia located adjacent to the border of Golden Beach to the north, which has strict single family residential zoning. All the skyscrapers in Sunny Isles Beach are residential and all of them are primarily concrete structurally. In general, the tallest height limit imposed by the Federal Aviation Administration (FAA) in Sunny Isles Beach is  Above Mean Sea Level (AMSL), due to the proximity of Miami-Opa Locka Executive Airport to the west. Several proposed towers may rise to exactly this height, though the FAA reviews each building individually.

Tallest buildings
All skyscrapers in the city are located on the east side of Collins Avenue.

Complete
The year indicates the year the building was completed. An equals sign (=) indicates multiple buildings that share the same height. Floor counts rely on reported numbers and may not account for skipped floors such as the thirteenth floor.

Under construction
Includes buildings between the foundation work and topped-out phases. Topped-out buildings may be included in the main list.

Proposed

Gallery

See also
List of tallest buildings in Miami
List of tallest buildings in Florida

References

Footnotes

Bibliography

Sunny Isles
Tallest in Sunny Isles Beach
Buildings and structures in Miami-Dade County, Florida